Adisak Ganu (born January 1, 1986) is a professional footballer from Thailand.

Notes 

1986 births
Living people
Adisak Ganu
Adisak Ganu
Association football wingers
Adisak Ganu
Adisak Ganu
Adisak Ganu
Adisak Ganu
Adisak Ganu
Adisak Ganu